Edelman is an American public relations and marketing consultancy firm, founded in 1952 by, and named after, Daniel Edelman. It is currently run by his son Richard Edelman. As of 2018, it is the largest public relations firm in the world by revenue and with 6,000 employees.

Edelman has a history of establishing astroturf campaigns (seemingly grassroots groups that are fronts for industry) for its clients. The company has provided services for the fossil fuel industry, which includes earning hundreds of millions of dollars to advocate on behalf of the American Petroleum Institute, a fossil fuel industry group dedicated to the advancement of climate change denial and blocking of climate legislation. It is a partner organization of the World Economic Forum.

Corporate history
Edelman public relations was founded in Chicago in 1952 by former journalist Daniel J. Edelman as Daniel J. Edelman and Associates. The company started with three employees and grew to serve 25 accounts by 1960.

Edelman's founder, Daniel Edelman, is credited with inventing the corporate media tour for his work with his previous employer, Toni Home Permanent Co. He toured the country with "The Toni Twins", a set of twins, where one used a professional salon and the other used Toni's home hair-care products. When Edelman started his own firm, Toni became Edelman's first client. Toni was followed by Sara Lee, a small cheesecake company at the time, and a bowling equipment manufacturer, Brunswick Corporation.

The agency opened the New York office in 1960. This was followed by a series of office openings around the globe spanning seven decades including London (1967); Washington, D.C. (1968); Hong Kong (1986); Silicon Valley (1992); and Beijing (1994). In the 2000s, the company has opened offices in Calgary, Dubai, South Africa and Colombia. 

The New York office grew from $1 million to $20 million in revenues from 1979 to the late 1980s under the leadership of Daniel Edelman's son, Richard Edelman. By 1981, Edelman had five international offices and it opened six more over the following decade. Some former employees and industry experts said its focus on financial growth led to high turnover and client service issues as a result. There was also an unsuccessful attempt by some employees to start their own firm with some of Edelman's clients.

Richard Edelman was named Global CEO of the eponymous firm in 1996. He took over for his father Daniel J. Edelman, who remained Chairman of Edelman until he died in 2013 at the age of 92. In the 1990s, offices were opened in Mexico, Brazil, Argentina, Germany, Spain, South Korea, China, and Belgium. In the United States, a Silicon Valley office was opened in 1992 to serve technology clients, and in Sacramento, California, in 1994. It also opened offices in Florida, Georgia, and Washington. The firm grew to $70 million in revenues by 1994.

In 1995, Edelman was the first public relations firm to have a website and began web-based projects for its clients. By the early 2000s it grew to $210 million with about 25% of revenues coming from Europe. In September 2010, Edelman acquired a Houston-based firm, Vollmer public relations.

With the introduction of Edelman Internet Services in 1995, Edelman became the first public relations firm to launch a digital practice.

Edelman Internet Services would go on to become Edelman Digital. And in 2018, the 600-plus-member practice was named Global Digital Agency of the Year by PRovoke Media.

An office was opened in Turkey in 2012. By 2012, it had established the Edelman Digital division with about 600 staff and about half of its work was social media-related. It acquired technology public relations firm, A&R, in 2006. In January 2013, the firm launched The Daniel J. Edelman China Group.

In 2012 it introduced the Business and Social Purpose division. It also introduced the Employee Engagement Connections Index, which helps users evaluate employee engagement through data collected in employee surveys, social media conversations, and feedback from human resources departments.

Edelman launched a joint venture with United Talent Agency in 2014 that resulted in the formation of a unit called United Entertainment Group (UEG). UEG specializes in entertainment, sports and lifestyle marketing. The unit saw 10% growth in 2019.

In September 2018, Edelman was listed by UK-based company Richtopia at number 4 in the list of 200 Most Influential PR Companies.

Matthew Harrington, a 35-year Edelman veteran and current Chief Operating Officer, was named Global President of the firm in 2019. He participated on behalf of Edelman in the October 2019 Event 201 coronavirus pandemic preparedness exercise in New York City.

Judy John was named Edelman's first-ever Global Chief Creative Officer in February 2019.

Lisa Osborne Ross was named CEO of Edelman's U.S. operation in April 2021. Ross became the first Black woman to run a PR operation of that size.

Other clients have included Heineken, Vidal Sassoon, Red Cross, Cantor Fitzgerald, Royal Dutch Shell, The Church of Jesus Christ of Latter-day Saints, and Starbucks. Equifax hired Edelman for crisis control after the October 2017 privacy breach. Edelman worked with Finland to improve its image in part through the Finnfacts Institute it founded in the 1960s. It promoted wine for the California Wine Institute and promoted bowling for the National Bowling Council by emphasizing it as a way to stay in shape. The firm worked with Symantec to promote the Norton brand of antivirus software.

Trust Barometer 
Since 2000, Edelman has published an annual report gauging trust levels and perceived credibility among the general population towards governments, media, non-governmental organizations and corporations. Each year is titled based on a theme.

Controversies 
Edelman has a history of establishing astroturf campaigns (seemingly grassroots groups that are fronts for industry) for its clients. The company has created front groups and advised clients to plant articles, letters and opinion pieces that appear to be spontaneous testimonials.

Microsoft antitrust 
In April 1998 the Los Angeles Times reported that Edelman had drafted a campaign plan to ensure that state attorneys-general did not join antitrust legal actions against Microsoft. Documents obtained by the LA Times revealed that the plan included generating supportive letters to the editor, opinion pieces, and articles by freelance writers. The LA Times said the plan included, "unusual and some say unethical tactics, including the planting of articles, letters to the editor and opinion pieces to be commissioned by Microsoft's top media handlers but presented by local firms as spontaneous testimonials".

Working Families for Wal-Mart front group 
In the 2000s, Edelman created a front group called the Working Families for Wal-Mart, which said it was a grassroots organization, but was actually funded by Wal-Mart. It paid two bloggers to travel the country interviewing Wal-Mart employees, one of whom was a senior Edelman employee's sister. According to The New Yorker, "everyone she talked to was delighted with Wal-Mart". In 2006, BusinessWeek reported that the public relations effort, which was positioned as a grassroots blog, was actually paid for by Wal-Mart. The New Yorker called it a "blatant example of astroturfing".

In 2007, it was reported that Wal-Mart paid Edelman approximately $10 million annually.

Fossil fuel companies and climate change deniers 
According to The Washington Post, Edelman's "work with the fossil fuel industry has been under scrutiny for years." According to a 2021 study, Edelman is a major factor in the climate issue arena. 

In 2008 Edelman's work with E.ON, which planned to build a coal power station at Kingsnorth attracted protests at Edelman's UK headquarters. In 2009, to coincide with the weeklong "Climate Camp" range of protests, a group of naked protestors occupied Edelman's reception.

Edelman was commissioned by TransCanada Corporation to run campaigns supporting the Keystone XL pipeline, a proposed pipeline to carry crude from Canada's oil sands to refineries on the Gulf coast of Texas. Edelman also developed a strategy for the proposed Energy East pipeline intended to carry oil through Québec, en route to a deep water harbor at Cacouna, Quebec for export abroad in supertankers and to refineries in New Brunswick. This resulted in a major controversy when documents leaked to Greenpeace revealed that Edelman had made some unethical proposals to sway public opinion in favor of its client. TransCanada distanced itself from those proposals as soon as the "dirty tricks" were published in the press. In 2015, the firm said that it would cease work for coal producers and climate change deniers. By 2022, the company still worked for oil and gas companies.

The firm has provided services to the government of Saudi Arabia. 

From 2008 to 2011, Edelman was paid an average of $68.9 million a year by the American Petroleum Institute, which has been dedicated to the advancement of climate change denial and blocking of climate legislation. Analysts estimate that Edelman earned at least $100 million more from the organization. Edelman used front groups to help the American Petroleum Institute reduce the perceived environmental damage caused by oil companies.

In June 2016, Edelman was hired by the International Centre for Legal Protection (ICLP), led by Andrey Kondakov, former director in the Russian Ministry of Foreign Affairs. The company was hired to "turn the tide of public opinion" and "help influence U.S. opinion on a massive court verdict involving the oil giant Yukos."

News Corporation phone hacking scandal 
Edelman provided crisis communication services to News Corporation during the phone hacking scandal.

Private prison industry 
Edelman supported private prison company GEO Group and helped in "laundering the reputation of private US concentration camps" in July 2019. In May 2019, executives from the Washington, D.C. office, including office president Lisa Ross and former Trump White House deputy press secretary Lindsay Walters, went to Florida to present the pitch. In June, when word spread across the company that the work was being pursued, debate sprang up on networking app Fishbowl. The work was resigned by Edelman in July 2019 and announced during an all-hands meeting in Washington. On Fishbowl, an employee commented that the executives "took the opportunity to basically shame us for ruining the work for the company because they couldn't trust us not to leak it to the press." Other employees on Fishbowl made similar comments.

The company's official response was that "Edelman takes on complex and diverse clients ... and ultimately decided not to proceed with this work." Edelman also refused to confirm they did similar work for another major private prison company, CoreCivic.

Saudi PR
Edelman and Saudi Arabia have contracts worth about $9.6 million (£7.9m) signed over the last four years. Freedom House has named the Kingdom as one of the “worst of the worst” countries globally as far as human rights, political and civil liberties are concerned. Reportedly, during the time of Jamal Khashoggi’s murder, one of the many PR firms to help Saudi Arabia work on its global reputation was Edelman. The firm received or contracted $9.6 million in fees from the agencies and companies controlled by the Gulf regime, as per US Department of Justice filing documents published by watchdog group OpenSecrets.

See also
StrategyOne

References

Consulting firms established in 1952
Public relations companies of the United States
1952 establishments in Illinois